Waldegg is a quarter in the district 3 of Winterthur.

It was a part of Seen municipality that was incorporated into Winterthur in 1922.

Winterthur